Loch Garten is a large Highland freshwater loch near Boat of Garten, in the Strathspey area of the Cairngorms National Park, in Scotland. It is surrounded by the tall pine trees of the Abernethy Forest, a large area (adjacent to the loch) of which is an RSPB nature reserve. The loch is renowned for its breeding population of ospreys, which lend Boat of Garten its nickname "The Osprey Village".

Careless behaviour towards the osprey in Britain throughout the 19th century meant that it became extinct as a breeding bird by the early 20th. However, in 1954 two Scandinavian breeding birds came to Garten completely of their own accord and set up a nest in the forest by the loch. Slowly the species recolonised Scotland (for more information see ospreys in Britain), and the RSPB and other organisations helped them along the way (not an easy task due to the illegal activities of egg collectors and other irresponsible people). The reserve was purchased by the charity and since then the nest has always been closely monitored. Recently a viewing hide was built relatively near to the nest so that visitors may come and see these birds of prey easily. The hide has telescopes and other optical devices inside, as well as television screens showing close-up views of the fledglings and their parents. Live video and still pictures of the nest can be viewed on the RSPB Loch Garten Reserve web-site.

Ospreys are not the only creatures to be found at Loch Garten. Western capercaillies, though difficult to see, do inhabit the remoter parts of the reserve and can be seen performing their annual lek via the spring "Caperwatch". Red squirrels can be seen very easily around the hide, especially on the feeders put out for them. Smaller birds such as the Eurasian siskin, common chaffinch (in very large numbers) and great spotted woodpecker are also present and easy to spot on the feeders. The crested tit and Scottish crossbill are more reserved in their behaviour and more difficult to find. Eurasian wigeon live by and swim on the loch.

Loch Garten Osprey Centre

The Loch Garten Osprey Centre is a bird-watching facility on Loch Garten that focuses on the nest of two ospreys. It is an RSPB facility located in the Abernethy Forest. The Abernethy Forest RSPB reserve protects a habitat of Caledonian pine forest and in turn forms part of the wider Abernethy National Nature Reserve.

The birds return to the nesting site every year and the numerous binoculars and telescopes within the centre allow for effective bird watching. Visitors can also see red squirrels and other small birds feeding in front of the bird hide. A pair of ospreys nested at the site every year from 1959 to 2019. Since then there has been no resident pair. Osprey chciks have fledged here almost every year since ospreys started nesting in 1954 however no chick's have fledged from the site between 2016 and 2021. The tree which houses the nest died due to the droppings and remains of prey from the nesting birds. To protect the site, the remaining tree trunk is supported by a strut and helps form a sturdy platform for the nest. The tree was deemed dangerous and in the winter of 2021 the nest (which was largely artificial) was relocated to a completely healthy Scots pine a few metres away. The tree canopy surrounding the nest was also lowered at the same time in an effort to make the nest site more appealing to ospreys  In 2022 a new pair of ospreys took over the new nest site and raised two young. 

The surrounding forest includes walking different paths passing by a large loch which is also known as Loch Mallachie. Some of the trails link up with the Speyside way.

See also
 Abernethy Forest
 Ospreys in Britain

References

External links
The RSPB: Loch Garten

Royal Society for the Protection of Birds reserves in Scotland
Badenoch and Strathspey
Birdwatching sites in Scotland
Protected areas of Highland (council area)
Garten
Nature centres in Scotland
Garten